Thongs may refer to:

Thong, a garment which primarily covers only the pubic area.
G-string, a variant of the thong garment.
Flip-flops, (Commonly known as thongs in Australia) a type of footwear.
Long, thin strips, generally of sturdy fiber or leather, typically used for binding.
The thin, flexible strand or strands of a whip.